Jung Soon-ok (born 23 April 1983) is a South Korean long jumper.

She finished  fifth at the 2006 Asian Games. She also competed at the 2007 World Championships and the 2008 Olympic Games without reaching the final.

Her personal best jump is 6.76 metres, achieved in June 2009 in Daegu.

Achievements

References

South Korean female long jumpers
Athletes (track and field) at the 2008 Summer Olympics
Olympic athletes of South Korea
1983 births
Living people
Asian Games medalists in athletics (track and field)
Athletes (track and field) at the 2006 Asian Games
Athletes (track and field) at the 2010 Asian Games
Athletes (track and field) at the 2014 Asian Games
Asian Games gold medalists for South Korea
Medalists at the 2010 Asian Games
21st-century South Korean women